"Sometimes" is a song co-written and recorded by American country music artist Clay Davidson.  It was released in January 2001 as the third single from the Unconditional  The song reached #21 on the Billboard Hot Country Singles & Tracks chart.  The song was written by Davidson, Kenny Beard and Casey Beathard.

Chart performance

References

2001 singles
2000 songs
Clay Davidson songs
Songs written by Kenny Beard
Songs written by Casey Beathard
Song recordings produced by Scott Hendricks
Virgin Records singles